Lateefah Simon (born January 29, 1977) is an elected member of the Bay Area Rapid Transit board of directors and the president of MeadowFund, a donor-advised fund created by Patricia Quillin, the wife of Netflix co-founder Reed Hastings. Simon was previously the president of Akonadi Foundation, an organization focused on racial justice in Oakland, California. In 2003, she received a MacArthur Fellowship for her leadership of the Center for Young Women's Development (now the Young Women's Freedom Center) from age 19.

During the tenure of Kamala Harris as San Francisco District Attorney, Simon led the creation of the city's Back on Track program for young adults charged with low-level felony drug sales. Simon also previously worked as the executive director of the Lawyers' Committee for Civil Rights of the San Francisco Bay Area.

In 2016, Simon was appointed to the California State University Board of Trustees by Governor Jerry Brown.

Simon was elected to represent the seventh district on the Bay Area Rapid Transit District board of directors in 2016. Her motivations for running included her reliance on BART, as someone who is legally blind and unable to drive. In 2020, she was elected president of the board of directors.

In February 2023, Simon announced that she was running for California's 12th congressional district. The current representative for the district, Barbara Lee, is vacating the seat as a candidate in the 2024 United States Senate election in California.

Personal life 

Simon earned a BA in public policy at Mills College, an MPA from the University of San Francisco, and was a 2014 Social Entrepreneurs-in-Residence Fellow at Stanford University, where she was the 2017 commencement speaker.

She is the mother of two children and has written about the difference in how she was treated as an unwed mother and as a widowed mother. Simon's late husband, Kevin Weston, was a recognized journalist and activist who died from leukemia in 2014.

Awards
 2003 MacArthur Fellows Program
 2007 Jefferson Award

References

1977 births
Activists from the San Francisco Bay Area
American blind people
Living people
MacArthur Fellows
Mills College alumni
People from San Francisco